Valzer ("Waltz") is a 2007 Italian film written and directed by Salvatore Maira. It was presented the first time at 64th Venice International Film Festival.

The film was quite all acted at NH Santo Stefano hotel in Turin.

Plot

Assunta, is a young girl working in a luxe hotel where is a troubled meeting of leaders of the Football Association. Meanwhile, comes a man, just out of prison, father of Lucia, a friend of the Assunta. Among them it bears a friendship in which everyone finds consolation and hope for the future.

Cast

 Maurizio Micheli: Lucia's father
 Valeria Solarino: Assunta
 Marina Rocco: Lucia
 Graziano Piazza: The chief
 Eugenio Allegri: The professor
 Zaira Berrazouga: Fatima
 Cristina Serafini: Young manager
 Giuseppe Moretti: Vittorio
 Francesco Feletti: The chief's assistant
 Francesco Cordio: The young trainer
 Benedicta Boccoli: Maria
 Rosaria Russo: Hammam's women

References

External links
 
  Valzer on Coming Soon

2007 films
2007 drama films
Italian drama films
2000s Italian-language films
Films set in 2007
Films set in Italy
Films set in Turin
2000s Italian films